Downer Tavern, also known as the Jonathan Downer House, is a historic home that also served as an inn and tavern located in Chalk Hill, Wharton Township, Fayette County, Pennsylvania.  It was built about 1826, and is a -story, 5-bay, brick building with a center hall floor plan with Federal style detailing. It has a two-story, kitchen ell. Also on the property is a -story stone spring house (now a residence) and a late-19th century frame wash house.  It served as a stop for 19th-century travelers on the National Road.

It was added to the National Register of Historic Places in 1995.

References

Houses on the National Register of Historic Places in Pennsylvania
Federal architecture in Pennsylvania
Houses completed in 1826
Houses in Fayette County, Pennsylvania
1826 establishments in Pennsylvania
National Register of Historic Places in Fayette County, Pennsylvania